The South African Railways Class 15A 4-8-2 of 1914 was a steam locomotive.

Between 1914 and 1925, the South African Railways placed 119 Class 15A steam locomotives with a 4-8-2 Mountain type wheel arrangement in service, delivered in ten batches from three manufacturers.

Manufacturers
The Classes 15 and 15A were the final development of the plate-framed  Mountain locomotive designed by D.A. Hendrie, Chief Mechanical Engineer (CME) of the South African Railways (SAR) from 1910 to 1922. Of the whole Hendrie Mountain family, the Class 15A was the most numerous and proved to be his most useful.

The predecessor Class 15 locomotives had one flaw, their excessively long fire tubes. When the first five of these redesigned locomotives were delivered in 1914, they were designated Class 15A. Altogether 119 were ultimately built in ten batches by three manufacturers. Being wartime, initial production and delivery occurred in dribs and drabs.
 Five were delivered by the North British Locomotive Company (NBL) in July 1914, numbered in the range from 1571 to 1575.
 Eight more were delivered by NBL, also in 1914, numbered in the range from 1781 to 1788. Like the Class 15, these first thirteen locomotives had narrow cabs, rear end running boards which curved down below their cabs and Belpaire fireboxes, but unlike the Class 15, the firebox had a combustion chamber.
 Ten more were delivered by NBL in 1915, numbered in the range from 1789 to 1798. While the first two batches were delivered with all coupled wheels flanged, beginning with this third batch the leading coupled wheels were flangeless to cope with the sharp curves on the Hex River Pass. These and subsequent locomotives had rear end running boards which continued straight through underneath their cabs.
 Six more were delivered by NBL in 1916, numbered in the range from 1799 to 1804.
 Four more were delivered by NBL in 1917, numbered in the range from 1805 to 1808.
 Twenty more were delivered by NBL in 1920, numbered in the range from 1809 to 1828. These twenty and all subsequent Class 15A locomotives were delivered with wider cabs.
 Twenty were delivered by Beyer, Peacock and Company in 1920, numbered in the range from 1839 to 1858.
 Ten more were delivered by Beyer, Peacock in 1921, numbered in the range from 1961 to 1970.
 Fifteen were delivered by NBL in 1921, numbered in the range from 2011 to 2025.
 Twenty-one were delivered by J.A. Maffei in 1925, numbered in the range from 2080 to 2100.

Characteristics

Firebox
To reduce the weight on the trailing wheels, steel fireboxes were originally used instead of copper. Some locomotives in Natal had been fitted with steel fireboxes years previously and the results were fairly good, but wherever water supplies were of poor quality, steel fireboxes gave a lot of trouble and necessitated the introduction of water treatment plants to prevent corrosion. This reintroduction of steel fireboxes eventually led to its widespread use on all the larger locomotive types, but it also forced the SAR to adopt locomotive water treatment as a general policy.

The first five locomotives of 1914 were delivered with steel fireboxes. In the case of the Classes 15 and 15A, it was still early days for water treatment and enough trouble was experienced to result in their steel fireboxes being replaced with copper fireboxes. Hendrie followed a conservative policy in this respect and the majority of the rest of the Class 15A fleet were originally fitted with copper fireboxes. Steel fireboxes were only to be fitted in large numbers by his successor, Colonel F.R. Collins DSO, and only the last batch of 1925, supplied by Maffei, were delivered with steel fireboxes.

Valve gear experiment
The last Class 15A locomotive, Maffei-built no. 2100, was fitted with Lentz Rotary Cam Poppet valve gear as an experiment, but this was later replaced with Walschaerts valve gear and piston-valve cylinders, thereby turning no. 2100 into a standard Class 15A.

Watson Standard boilers
During the 1930s, many serving locomotives were reboilered with a standard boiler type designed by A.G. Watson, CME of the SAR from 1929 to 1936, as part of his standardisation policy. Such Watson Standard reboilered locomotives were reclassified by adding an "R" suffix to their classification.

When Class 15A locomotives were reboilered with Watson Standard no. 2A boilers, they were therefore reclassified to Class 15AR. Early conversions were equipped with copper and later conversions with steel fireboxes. In the process, they were also equipped with Watson cabs with their distinctive slanted fronts, compared to the conventional vertical fronts of their original cabs, while the cab platform was extended over the front end of the tender underframe. Many of the reboilered engines were later fitted with Type MR or Type MT tenders.

Since the only difference between the as-delivered Class 15 and Class 15A lay in the length of their boilers and whether they were built with or without combustion chambers, both models were reclassified to Class 15AR when they were reboilered with Watson Standard boilers. In the case of the Class 15A engines, reboilering replaced their combustion-chambered Belpaire boilers with less efficient Watson Standard boilers without combustion chambers and it was found that the rebuilds were inferior steamers compared with their non-rebuilt sister engines.

Their original Belpaire boilers were fitted with Ramsbottom safety valves, while the Watson Standard boiler was fitted with Pop safety valves. Another obvious difference between an original and a Watson Standard reboilered locomotive is usually a rectangular regulator cover, just to the rear of the chimney on the reboilered locomotive. In the case of the Class 15A and Class 15AR, two even more obvious differences are the Watson cab and the absence of the Belpaire firebox hump between the cab and boiler on the reboilered locomotives. In addition, during reboilering the early Class 15A models with curved down rear end running boards and narrow cabs were altered to straight rear end running boards with Watson cabs.

Service
The Class 15A, one of the best classes of mainline mixed traffic locomotives to see service in South Africa, was placed in service on the Cape mainline to Kimberley where they formed the mainstay of motive power for many years. The engine was a good utility type and gave a good account of itself on goods and passenger working alike. It is noted for reducing the running time of the Union Limited by 2½ hours in March 1922. When they were superseded on this section by more powerful types, they ended up working in all parts of the country and proved to be reliable, free-steaming locomotives which ran up high mileage figures between major overhauls.

As the reboilered Class 15AR, many ended up working in the Eastern Transvaal around Waterval Boven, in the Western Transvaal, Eastern Cape and the Orange Free State. During the 1960s, many were transferred to the Cape Midland and used mainly on the section from Port Elizabeth to Klipplaat and in passenger service on the Uitenhage suburban.

Near the end of their service lives in the early 1980s, they were all relegated to shunting work at centres all around the country, except for some which were hired out to Swaziland and which were still employed in mainline service on the Swaziland Railway until they were eventually replaced by diesel traction and retired. By the time they were withdrawn after more than sixty years in service, many of these locomotives had completed three million miles of heavy-duty mainline work.

Works numbers
The table lists the Class 15A engine numbers, builders, years built, works numbers and eventual classifications.

Preservation

Illustration
The main picture shows reboilered 1914-built Class 15A no. 1788 at Graaff Reinet on 4 April 1978. Differences between the various locomotive models are illustrated in the pictures below.
Locomotives as built, with Belpaire fireboxes.

Ex narrow cab Class 15AR locomotives, reboilered with Watson Standard no. 2A boilers.

Ex wide cab Class 15AR locomotives, reboilered with Watson Standard no. 2A boilers.

References

1820
1820
1820
4-8-2 locomotives
2D1 locomotives
NBL locomotives
Beyer, Peacock locomotives
Maffei locomotives
Cape gauge railway locomotives
Railway locomotives introduced in 1914
1914 in South Africa